Dendi Agustan Maulana (born 19 August 1995) is an Indonesian professional footballer who plays as a defender for Liga 1 club PS Barito Putera.

Club career

PSGC Ciamis
He was signed for PSGC Ciamis to play in Liga 2 in the 2017 season and made 15 league appearances for PSGC Ciamis.

Kalteng Putra
In 2018, Dendi Maulana signed a contract with Indonesian Liga 2 club Kalteng Putra.

PSS Sleman
He was signed for PSS Sleman to play in Liga 1 in the 2020 season. Dendi Maulana made his league debut on 1 November 2021 in a match against Borneo at the Manahan Stadium, Surakarta.

Barito Putera
Dendi was signed for Barito Putera to play in Liga 1 in the 2022–23 season. He made his league debut on 23 July 2022 in a match against Madura United at the Gelora Ratu Pamelingan Stadium, Pamekasan.

Career statistics

Club

Honours

Club
Kalteng Putra
 Liga 2 third place (play-offs): 2018

 PSS Sleman
 Menpora Cup third place: 2021

References

External links
 Dendi Maulana at Soccerway
 Dendi Maulana at Liga Indonesia

1995 births
Living people
Indonesian footballers
PSS Sleman players
Association football defenders
Kalteng Putra F.C. players
PS Barito Putera players
Liga 1 (Indonesia) players
Liga 2 (Indonesia) players
People from Serang
Sportspeople from Banten